Kevin Lawrence Alston (born May 5, 1988) is an American soccer player.

Club career
Alston played college soccer for the Indiana University Hoosiers, where he was a two-time All-Big Ten selection in 2007 and 2008, and a 2008 NSCAA All-Great Lakes region selection.

New England Revolution

Alston was drafted in the first round (10th overall) of the 2009 MLS SuperDraft by New England Revolution after signing a Generation Adidas contract with Major League Soccer. He made his professional debut on March 21, 2009, in New England's first game of the 2009 MLS season against the San Jose Earthquakes.  Alston was selected to his first Major League Soccer All-Star Game during the 2010 season and was in the starting lineup for the match in Houston against Manchester United.

Alston scored his first professional goal in the final of SuperLiga 2010, but the Revolution lost 2–1 to Monarcas Morelia of Mexico. Alston scored his first league goal April 12, 2014 at home against the Houston Dynamo.

Alston scored his first Major League Soccer goal on April 12, 2014 in 2–0 victory against Houston Dynamo.

Orlando City
Alston's contract option was declined by New England at the end of the 2015 MLS season, and he was selected by Orlando City in the 2nd phase of the MLS Re-Entry Draft.

Orange County SC
On June 8, 2018, Alston joined United Soccer League side Orange County SC.

International career
Alston was a member of U.S. Soccer's Residency Program and the Under-17 National Team from September 2003 through his enrollment at Indiana in January 2006. He appeared in 76 matches while at the Residency Program, starting 51 and recording one goal and three assists. He earned 17 caps as a member of the U-17 National Team, including three starts at the 2005 FIFA U-17 World Championship in Peru. He also represented the U.S. at the Pan American Games in Brazil in the summer of 2007.

On December 22, 2009, Alston received his first call up to train with the senior US national team in preparation for a January friendly match against Honduras, however, he suffered a hamstring injury in training and was unable to participate. Alston was called up for the following friendly against El Salvador, but again had to pull out after a recurrence of the hamstring injury. He has yet to make his senior national team debut.

Personal life
Kevin is the son of Jeanne Fox-Alston and Larry Alston. He has one older brother, Kenneth, who is a University of Virginia graduate and holds an MBA from the Stanford Graduate School of Business.  Kevin grew up in Silver Spring, Maryland where he attended Woodlin Elementary School. Kevin majored in management at Indiana. He enjoys hip-hop and R&B and counts Lil' Wayne among his favorite musical artists. His favorite movies Gladiator, Man on Fire, Act of Valor and many others. Kevin's grandfather, Richard K. Fox, Jr., is a retired foreign service professional who served as US Ambassador to Trinidad and Tobago.

On April 8, 2013 it was announced that Alston had taken an indefinite leave of absence from the team to undergo treatment for chronic myelogenous leukemia, a rare but treatable form of leukemia. In July 2013, Alston returned to soccer and was removed from the disabled list.

Honors
MLS Comeback Player of the Year Award: 2013

References

External links

 
 

1988 births
Living people
American soccer players
African-American soccer players
Association football fullbacks
Footballers at the 2007 Pan American Games
Indiana Hoosiers men's soccer players
Major League Soccer All-Stars
Major League Soccer players
New England Revolution draft picks
New England Revolution players
Orange County SC players
Orlando City SC players
Orlando City B players
Pan American Games competitors for the United States
People from Silver Spring, Maryland
Soccer players from Washington, D.C.
United States men's youth international soccer players
USL Championship players
21st-century African-American sportspeople
20th-century African-American people